Reel Big Fish (RBF) is an American ska punk band from Los Alamitos, California. Formed in December 1991, the group originally consisted of vocalist Ben Guzman, guitarists Aaron Barrett and Lisa Smith, bassist Matt Wong, keyboardist Zach Gilltrap and drummer Andrew Gonzales. The group's current lineup features Barrett, who took over as lead vocalist in 1993, alongside trumpeter John Christianson (since 2004), bassist Derek Gibbs (since 2007), saxophonist Matt Appleton (since 2011), drummer Ed "Smokey Beach" Larsen (since 2014) and trombonist Brian Robertson (since 2019).

History
RBF was formed as a hard rock outfit in December 1991. The original lineup featured Ben Guzman, Aaron Barrett, Lisa Smith, Matt Wong, Zach Gilltrap and Andrew Gonzales, who released the band's first self-titled demo tape (known as In the Good Old Days...) in 1992. By the following year, Barrett had taken over on lead vocals and decided to pursue a ska direction for the group, which was now a three-piece comprising himself, Wong and Gonzales. For their second self-titled demo (known as Return of the Mullet), the trio employed the services of trumpeter Eric Vismantas and saxophonist Stephan Reed.

By 1994, RBF had added Tavis Werts on trumpet, Dan Regan on trombone and Adam Polakoff on saxophone, who released Buy This! that year. By the time the group recorded its debut full-length album Everything Sucks, Robert Quimby had joined as a second trombonist. Quimby and Polakoff left before Turn the Radio Off, on which second trumpeter Scott Klopfenstein and new trombonist Grant Barry debuted. During the tour in promotion of 1998's Why Do They Rock So Hard?, Gonzales left in February 1999 to "pursue other interests and spend more time at home". He was followed the next month by Barry, who was dismissed for "personal differences".

With new drummer Carlos de la Garza, RBF recorded much of Cheer Up! during 2000, before Werts quit in October 2001 and recording was completed by Tyler Jones, who took over his position the next month. In the summer of 2003, de la Garza was replaced by Justin Ferreira, a bandmate of Barrett's in the Forces of Evil. Another member of the Forces of Evil, trumpeter John Christianson, replaced Jones following his departure in September 2004. In 2005 the band released We're Not Happy 'til You're Not Happy, before Ferreira left in early 2005 and was replaced by Ryland Steen. Monkeys for Nothin' and the Chimps for Free followed in July 2007.

In June 2007, founding member Matt Wong announced his departure from RBF in order to "settle down and be a family man"; he was replaced by the Forces of Evil bassist Derek Gibbs. The new lineup released Fame, Fortune and Fornication in 2009, followed by A Best of Us... for the Rest of Us and Skacoustic in 2010. In January 2011, long-term trumpeter and multi-instrumentalist Scott Klopfenstein left the group for a similar reason as Wong, stating that he wanted to "dedicate his life to raising a family". John Christianson subsequently became the band's sole trumpeter, as Klopfenstein was replaced by Goldfinger touring saxophonist Matt Appleton.

After the release of Candy Coated Fury in 2012, another long-term horn player, trombonist Dan Regan, left RBF in October 2013 to focus on life with his family. He was replaced by Billy Kottage. In the summer of 2014, Ryland Steen left to tour with America and was replaced by Ed "Smokey Beach" Larsen. This lineup released one album, Life Sucks... Let's Dance! in 2018, before Kottage was replaced in the summer of 2019 by Brian Robertson of Suburban Legends.

Members

Current

Former

Timeline

Lineups

References

External links
Reel Big Fish official website

Reel Big Fish